Kindly Leave the Kerb is a 1971 British television sitcom which aired on ITV. It features Peter Butterworth as a second-rate escapologist, who busks around the streets of London with his companion played by Peter Jones.

The show was scripted by the writing team of Johnnie Mortimer and Brian Cooke.Produced by London Weekend Television it lasted for a single series. Actors who appeared in episodes of the show include Larry Martyn, Nicholas Smith, Geoffrey Hughes, Timothy Bateson, John Kidd, Arthur Brough, Roger Brierley, Hilda Barry and Katya Wyeth.

In 1981 the show was remade as The Incredible Mr Tanner with Brian Murphy and Roy Kinnear taking over the leading roles.

Main cast
 Peter Butterworth as Ernest Tanner
 Peter Jones as Sidney Rochester
 Meredith Edwards as Archie

References

Bibliography
 Donnelley, Paul. Fade to Black: A Book of Movie Obituaries. Omnibus Press, 2000.

External links
 

1971 British television series debuts
1971 British television series endings
1970s British comedy television series
ITV sitcoms
English-language television shows
London Weekend Television shows